Udodov is a Russian male surname, its feminine counterpart is Udodova. It may refer to
Ivan Udodov (1924–1981), Russian weightlifter 
Roman Udodov (born 1975), Russian association football official and former player
Larisa Udodova (born 1973), Olympic freestyle skier from Uzbekistan